(born March 27, 1972) is a retired male long jumper from Japan.

International competitions

References

1972 births
Living people
Japanese male long jumpers
Olympic male long jumpers
Olympic athletes of Japan
Athletes (track and field) at the 1992 Summer Olympics
Athletes (track and field) at the 2000 Summer Olympics
Asian Games gold medalists for Japan
Asian Games gold medalists in athletics (track and field)
Athletes (track and field) at the 1994 Asian Games
Athletes (track and field) at the 1998 Asian Games
Athletes (track and field) at the 2002 Asian Games
Medalists at the 1998 Asian Games
World Athletics Championships athletes for Japan
Asian Athletics Championships winners
Japan Championships in Athletics winners